USS Munsomo (ID-1607) was a cargo ship that served in the United States Navy from 1918 to 1919.

SS Munsomo was built as a commercial collier by the Maryland Steel Company at Sparrows Point, Maryland, in 1916, for the Munson Steamship Line. The U.S. Navy inspected her in the 3rd Naval District in 1917 for possible World War I service, and acquired her from Munson on 28 June 1918 for use as a cargo ship. Assigned the naval registry Identification Number (Id. No.) 1607, she was commissioned as USS Munsomo at Baltimore, Maryland, the same day.

Assigned to the Naval Overseas Transportation Service, Munsomo took on a cargo of United States Army supplies and departed New York City on 9 August 1918 to cross the Atlantic in a convoy, bound for France. She reached Nantes, France, on 29 August 1918. After discharging her cargo she moved on to Le Verdon-sur-Mer, France, then returned to the United States, arriving at Baltimore on 25 September 1918.

On 16 October 1918, Munsomo departed with a mixed cargo for a second transatlantic crossing in convoy, reaching Brest, France, on 2 November 1918. She proceeded to Nantes to ballast, then returned to the United States, arriving at Newport News, Virginia, on 29 November 1918.

Munsomo next made a run to Antilla, Cuba, carrying general supplies and returned to the United States with a cargo of sugar, arriving at New York City.

Munsomo was decommissioned on 4 February 1919 and transferred to the United States Shipping Board the same day for simultaneous return to Munson Steamship Line.

She returned to mercantile service as SS Munsomo. In 1938, she was sold to Italian interests and renamed SS Capo Orso. Capo Orso was sunk during World War II by a torpedo dropped by a torpedo plane.

Notes

References

Department of the Navy, Naval Historical Center: Online Library of Selected Images: Civilian Ships: S.S. Munsomo (American Freighter, 1916) Served as USS Munsomo (ID # 1607) in 1918-1919. Later S.S. Capo Orso.
NavSource Online NavSource Online: Section Patrol Craft Photo Archive Munsomo (ID 1607)

World War I cargo ships of the United States
Ships built in Sparrows Point, Maryland
1916 ships
Cargo ships of the United States Navy
Merchant ships sunk by aircraft